Roy is a masculine given name and a family surname with varied origin and It's a short form of Leroy.

In Anglo-Norman England, the name derived from the Norman roy, meaning "king", while its Old French source rey, roy (modern roi), likewise gave rise to Roy in the Francophone world. In India, Roy is a variant of the surname Rai, likewise meaning "king".

It also arose independently in Scotland, an anglicisation from the Scottish Gaelic nickname ruadh, meaning "red".

Given name 

 Roy Acuff (1903–1992), American country music singer and fiddler
 Roy Andersen (born 1955), runner
 Roy Andersen (South Africa) (born 1948), South African businessman and military officer
 Roy Anderson (American football) (born 1980), American football coach
 Sir Roy M. Anderson (born 1947), British scientific adviser
 Roy Andersson (born 1943), Swedish film director
 Roy Andersson (footballer) (born 1949), footballer from Sweden
 Roy Chapman Andrews (1884–1960), American naturalist and explorer
 Roy Ascott (born 1934), British artist and theorist
 Roy Black (singer) (1943–1991), German singer and actor
 Roy Blount Jr. (born 1941), American writer, speaker, reporter and humorist
 Roy Blunt (born 1950), United States Senator and former congressman
 Roy Bucher (1895-1980), British-Indian soldier and Commander-in-Chief
 Roy C (1939–2020), American soul and R&B singer and songwriter
 Roy Campanella (1921–1993), American Hall of Fame baseball catcher
 Roy Campanella II (born 1948), television director and producer, son of the above
 Roy Castle (1932–1994), English dancer, singer, musician, comedian, actor, television presenter and musician
 Roy Cimatu (born 1946), Filipino government administrator and retired army general
 Roy Clark (1933–2018), American country music singer and musician
 Roy Clarke (born 1930), English comedy writer
 Roy Christian (born 1943), New Zealand rugby league footballer
 Roy Cohn (1927–1986), American lawyer best known as Senator Joseph McCarthy's counsel from 1953 to 1954
 Roy Cooper (born 1957), American politician and governor of North Carolina
 Roy DeMeo (1940–1983), Italian-American mobster
 Roy de Silva (1937–2018), Sri Lankan Sinhala actor and director
 Roy E. Disney (1930–2009), American businessman
 Roy O. Disney (1893–1971), American businessman
 Roy Dobbin (1873-1939), founding member of the Royal College of Obstetricians and Gynaecologists
 Roy Drusky (1930–2004), American country music singer and songwriter
 Roy Face (born 1928), often referred to as "Elroy Face", American baseball relief pitcher
 Roy Firestone (born 1953), American sports talk show host
 Roy Foster (baseball) (1945–2008), American baseball player
 Roy Gagnon (1913–2000), American football player
 Roy J. Glauber (1925–2018), American physicist and 2005 Nobel prize winner
 Roy M. Goodman (1930–2014), New York state senator
 Roy Halladay (1977–2017), American baseball pitcher
 Roy Halliday (1923–2007), British vice-admiral
 Roy Halston Frowick (1932–1990), better known as Halston, clothing designer
 Roy Hamilton (1929–1969), American singer
 Roy Hamilton (basketball) (born 1957), American basketball player and sports television producer
 Roy Hargrove (1969–2018), American jazz trumpeter
 Roy Harper (disambiguation)
 Roy Harris (disambiguation)
 Roy Harrison (born 1939), Irish former cricketer
 Roy M. Harrison (born 1948), environmental chemist
 Roy Hartsfield (1925–2011), American Major League Baseball player and manager
 Roy Hattersley (born 1932), British politician, author and journalist
 Roy Head (1941–2020), American country music, rockabilly, and R&B singer
 Roy Hibbert (born 1986), Jamaican-American retired basketball player
 Roy Hodgson (born 1947), English former football player and current manager
 Roy Horn (born Uwe Ludwig Horn, 1944-2020), half of the Las Vegas show team Siegfried & Roy
 Roy Howell (born 1953), American former Major League baseball player
 Roy Lee Jackson (born 1954), American former Major League Baseball pitcher
 Roy Douglas Jayetileke, Sri Lankan Sinhala army officer
 Roy Jenkins (1920–2003), Welsh politician and author
 Roy Johnson (pitcher) (1895–1986), baseball pitcher, manager and longtime coach
 Roy Jones Jr. (born 1969), professional boxer
 Roy Keane (born 1971), Irish former football player and current manager
 Roy Khan (born 1970), former singer of power metal band Kamelot
 Roy Kim (born 1993), born Kim Sang-woo, South Korean singer-songwriter
 Roy Kinnear (1934–1988), English actor
 Roy Lechthaler (1908–1980), American football player
 Roy Li Fey Huei (born 1965), Singaporean musician
 Roy Lichtenstein (1923–1997), American pop artist
 Roy Lopez (American football) (born 1997), American football player
 Roy Makaay (born 1975), Dutch footballer and current manager
 Roy Masters (commentator) (born 1928), American talk radio personality, podcaster and spiritual counselor
 Roy McMillan (1929–1997), American baseball player
 Roy Morris (–2011), British Scout Leader, recipient of the Silver Wolf Award
 Roy Moore (born 1947), American politician and former state judge
 Roy Nachum (born 1979), Israeli contemporary artist
 Roy Nelson (disambiguation), multiple people
 Roy Niederhoffer (born 1966), American hedge fund manager and philanthropist
 Roy Nissany (born 1994), Israeli racing driver
 Roy Olmstead (1886-1966), American policeman, then bootlegger
 Roy Orbison (1936–1988), American singer-songwriter
 Roy Oxlade (1929–2014), English painter and writer on art
 Roy Pinney (1911–2010), herpetologist, professional photographer, writer, spelunker, pilot and war correspondent
 Roy Rogers (1911–1998), American singing movie cowboy
 Roy Rosselló (born 1970), former member of Puerto Rican Boyband Menudo from 1983–1986.
 Roy Sanders (Louisiana politician) (1904–1976), American educator and Louisiana state legislator
 Roy Scheider (1932–2008), film actor
 Roy Schwartz Tichon, Social entrepreneur promoting public transportation on Saturday in Israel
 Roy Schwitters (1944–2023), American physicist
 Roy D. Shapiro, Professor of Business Administration at the Harvard Business School
 Roy Shepherd (born 1931), British ice hockey player
 Roy Shepherd (pianist) (1907–1986), Australian pianist and teacher
 Roy Sievers (1926–2017), American baseball player
 Roy Smalley Jr. (1926–2011), American baseball player, father of Roy Smalley III
 Roy Smalley III (born 1952), American baseball player, son of Roy Smalley Jr.
 Roy Staiger (born 1950), baseball player in the late 1970s
 Roy Sullivan (1912–1983), American park ranger
 Roy Thomas (pitcher) (born 1953), American baseball player
 Roy Underhill (born 1950), host of the PBS series The Woodwright's Shop
 Roy Webb (1888–1982), gospel music pianist and speaker
 Roy White (born 1943), American all-star baseball player
 Roy Williams (basketball coach) (born 1950), American college basketball coach
 Roy Williamson (1936–1990), Scottish folk singer
 Roy Wilkins (1901–1981), civil rights activist
 Roy Wood (born 1946), English singer-songwriter and multi-instrumentalist

Surname 

 Anupam Roy (born 1982), Indian singer and music director
 Ajoy Roy (1935–2019), Bangladeshi physicist and human rights activist
 Anuradha Roy (novelist) (born 1967), Indian Bengali novelist and journalist
 Aruna Roy (born 1946), Indian Tamil social activist
 Arundhati Roy (born 1961), Indian Keralite novelist and political activist
 Avik Roy, American political commentator
 Bidhan Chandra Roy (1882–1962), Indian Bengali politician
 Bikash Roy (1916–1987), Indian Bengali actor
 Bimal Roy (1909–1966), Indian Bengali film director
 Brandon Roy (born 1984), American basketball player
 Bravvion Roy (born 1996), American football player
 Bryan Roy (born 1970), Dutch football (soccer) player and current manager
 Bunker Roy (born 1945), Indian Bengali social activist
 Claude Roy (physician) (born 1928), Canadian physician
 Claude Roy (poet) (1915–1997), French poet and essayist
 Claude Roy (politician) (born 1952), Canadian politician
 Craig Roy (born 1977), Australian sailor (RAN), RDA comedian of the year 2019, 2020, 2021
 Conrad Roy (1995–2014), American marine salvage captain whose suicide resulted in the manslaughter conviction of his girlfriend
 Debashree Roy (born 1961), Indian Bengali actress
 Deep Roy (born 1957), Kenyan-born Indian actor
 Derek Roy (born 1983), Canadian ice hockey player
 Derek Roy (comedian) (1922–1981), English comedian
 Dolon Roy (born 1970), Indian Bengali actress
 Drew Roy (born 1986), American actor
 Eric Roy (footballer) (born 1967), French footballer
 Eric Roy (politician) (born 1948), New Zealand politician
 Fabien Roy (born 1928), Canadian politician
 Falguni Roy (1945–1981), Indian Bengali poet
 Gabrielle Roy (1909–1983), Canadian author
 Helen Roy (born 1969), British ecologist, entomologist and academic
 Indra Lal Roy (1898–1918), Indian Bengali First World War flying ace
 Jahor Roy (1919–1977), Indian Bengali actor and comedian
 James Roy (politician) (1893–1971), New Zealand politician
 James Roy (writer) (born 1968), Australian writer
 James A. Roy (born 1964), US Chief Master Sergeant of the Air Force
 Jason Roy (born 1990), English cricketer
 Jeffrey Roy (born 1961), American politician and lawyer
 Jean Sebastien Roy, Canadian motocross rider who enjoyed success in the 2000s
 Jean-Yves Roy (born 1949), Canadian politician
 Juthika Roy (1920–2014), Indian Bengali singer
 Kalidas Roy (1889–1975), Indian Bengali poet
 Kanu Roy (1912–1981), Indian Bengali film actor, and music composer
 Leela Roy (1900–1970), Indian Bengali independence activist and social reformer
 Leo Roy (1904–1955), American/Canadian boxer
 M. N. Roy (1887–1954), Indian Bengali philosopher and revolutionary
 Mathieu Roy (ice hockey, born 1983), Canadian ice hockey player
 Mathieu Roy (ice hockey, born 1986), Canadian ice hockey player
 Matt Roy (born 1995), American ice hockey player
 Mouni Roy (born 1985), Indian actress
 Nirmal Roy (born 1996), Pakistani singer
 Nirupa Roy (1931–2004), Indian Gujarati actress
 Patrick Roy (born 1965), Canadian ice hockey head coach and former goaltender
 Peter Roy (1828-1881), American farmer and politician
 Prannoy Roy (born 1949), Indian Bengali journalist and media personality
 Prasanna Kumar Roy (1849–1932), Indian Bengali educationist
 Rachel Roy (born 1974), American fashion designer
 Ram Mohan Roy (1772–1833), Indian Bengali religious, social and educational reformer
 Rahul Roy (born 1966), Indian film actor
 Rohit Roy (born 1968), Indian actor
 Ronit Roy (born 1965), Indian actor
 Sarat Chandra Roy (1871–1942), Indian Bengali anthropologist
 Satabdi Roy (born 1968), Indian Bengali actress
 Shasanka Mohan Roy (born 1941), Indian quantum physicist
 Shehzad Roy (born 1979), Pakistani pop singer and social worker
 Subrata Roy (born 1948), Indian Bengali businessman
 Subimal Chandra Roy (1912–1971), Indian Bengali jurist
 Subodh Roy (1916–2006), Indian Bengali independence activist
 Sylvie Roy (1964–2016), Canadian politician
 Tarapada Roy (1936–2007), Indian Bengali author
 William Roy (1726–1790), Scottish surveyor

Fictional characters 

 Esme & Roy's eponymous monster
 Kiriti Roy, a fictional detective created by Nihar Ranjan Gupta
 Philly Boy Roy, from the radio show and podcast The Best Show with Tom Scharpling
 Roy, from the Fire Emblem franchise
 Roy, from the British sketch show Little Britain
 Roy, a minor character from the Peanuts comic strip
 Roy Biggins, a major character from Wings
 Roy Anderson, from The Office
 Roy Batty, the leader of the renegade replicants in the film Blade Runner
 Roy G. Bivolo, DC Comics supervillain known as Rainbow Raider
 Roy Carson, from Final Destination 5
 Roy Cropper, from the British soap opera Coronation Street
 Roy Earle, from the game L.A. Noire
 Roy Greenhilt, from the webcomic The Order of the Stick
 Roy Gribbleston, Yellow Guy's father from Don't Hug Me I'm Scared
 Roy Harper, a superhero in the DC Comics universe
 Roy Hobbs, protagonist of the Bernard Malamud novel The Natural and The Natural (film)
 Roy "Jawjack" Kelton, a character from the 1988 film 14 Going on 30
 Roy Kent, from the streaming television series Ted Lasso
 Roy Koopa, one of the Koopalings from the Mario franchise
 Roy Miller, protagonist from the 2010 film Green Zone
 Roy Miller, protagonist from the 2010 film Knight and Day
 Roy Mustang, from the manga Fullmetal Alchemist
 Roy Neary, protagonist from Close Encounters of the Third Kind
 Roy O'Brien, eponymous animated protagonist of Roy
 Roy Race, from the comic strip Roy of the Rovers
 Roy Rooster, in the comic strip U.S. Acres
 Roy Trenneman, from the British sitcom The IT Crowd
 The Roy family, from the series Succession
 Roy Raskin, one of the main characters in The Fairly OddParents: Fairly Odder

See also 

 Robert Roy MacGregor, commonly known as "Rob Roy"
 Rai (surname)
 Ray (given name)
 Ray (surname)
 Leroy (name)

References 

Surnames of Norman origin
English-language surnames
French-language surnames
Scottish masculine given names
Indian surnames
Bengali Hindu surnames